Ronald Marc George (born March 11, 1940) is an American jurist. He previously served as the 27th Chief Justice of California from 1996 to 2011. Governor Pete Wilson appointed George as an associate justice of the Supreme Court in 1991 and elevated George to Chief Justice in 1996.

Early life and education
George grew up in Beverly Hills, the son of a Hungarian immigrant mother and French immigrant father.

George attended the International School in Geneva, Switzerland from 1952-1953 and 1955-1956. He graduated from  Beverly Hills High School in 1957. He earned an A.B. from Princeton University in 1961 and J.D. from Stanford Law School in 1964.

California Deputy Attorney General 
After graduating from Stanford, George served as a Deputy Attorney General of California from 1965–1972.

As a Deputy Attorney General, he argued before the United States Supreme Court in Chimel v. California (1969) and McGautha v. California (1970).  In 1971, he represented California as an amicus curiae in support of the State of Illinois in Kirby v. Illinois.

In 1972, his final year as a Deputy Attorney General, George unsuccessfully argued in California v. Anderson. He was successful in defending the conviction of Sirhan Sirhan for the assassination of Robert F. Kennedy.

Judicial career

Los Angeles Municipal Court 
Governor Ronald Reagan appointed George as a Judge of the Los Angeles Municipal Court on April 20, 1972.  George was elected to a full six-year term on November 2, 1976.

Los Angeles County Superior Court 
Governor Jerry Brown appointed him to the Los Angeles County Superior Court on December 23, 1977; George was elected to a full six-year term on November 7, 1978, and re-elected on November 6, 1984.

As a Superior Court judge, George presided over the trial of Hillside Strangler Angelo Buono in 1981–83. In that trial, George made the extremely unusual decision to deny the District Attorney's motion to dismiss all 10 counts of murder. The prosecutors felt their evidence against Buono was so weak that it did not justify even an attempt to win at trial, and trial judges rarely second-guess such decisions.

George reassigned the case to the California Attorney General's office, and that office successfully convicted Buono on nine of the 10 counts. Thus, it was recognized that the judge, through his action to deny the earlier motion to dismiss, had ultimately prevented a serial killer from going free.  Oddly, Los Angeles County District Attorney John Van de Kamp had been elected California Attorney General during the lengthy trial, so he led both the office trying to dismiss the charges and the office that successfully won conviction.

George also presided over the trial of Marvin Gay Sr. for the slaying of Gay's son, the singer Marvin Gaye.

California Court of Appeal 
Governor George Deukmejian appointed him to the California Second District Court of Appeal on July 23, 1987.  George was confirmed and sworn in on August 27, 1987, and was elected to a full twelve-year term on November 6, 1990.

Supreme Court of California
Governor Pete Wilson appointed George as an associate justice of the California Supreme Court on July 29, 1991, and he was sworn in on September 3. California voters elected him to a full twelve-year term on November 8, 1994.

Wilson appointed George as the 27th Chief Justice of California on March 28, 1996. George was confirmed and sworn into office on May 1, 1996. He was elected to a full twelve-year term on November 3, 1998, with 75.5% percent of the vote.

In re Marriage Cases 
In 2008, Chief Justice George authored the opinion in the Supreme Court's 4–3 ruling in In re Marriage Cases legalizing same-sex marriage in California. Citing the court's 1948 decision legalizing interracial marriages, George's opinion found that sexual orientation is a protected class like race and gender, meaning that attempts to ban same-sex marriage would be subject to strict scrutiny under the Equal Protection Clause of the California Constitution. It was the first state high court in the country to do so.

Voters would overturn the decision less than six months later by passing Proposition 8 in the November 2008 elections. However, Proposition 8 would itself be later overturned by a federal court in Perry v. Schwarzenegger.

Potential Supreme Court nominee 
George was occasionally floated as a candidate for justice of the United States Supreme Court as a conservative acceptable to Democrats, such as when Democratic United States Senator Barbara Boxer suggested George as a potential nominee for the seat on the Court vacated by Sandra Day O'Connor's retirement. Boxer described both George and his fellow California Supreme Court Justice Kathryn Werdegar, as Republicans who "reflect the spirit of Sandra Day O'Connor's tenureindependent and nonideological."

Retirement 
On July 14, 2010, Chief Justice George announced he would not seek to be re-elected in 2010 and would therefore retire at the end of his term: January 2, 2011. He was succeeded by Tani Cantil-Sakauye.

In 2013, after his retirement, he published a book of memoirs, Chief: The Quest for Justice in California, about his term on the Supreme Court.

Personal life
On January 30, 1966, George married Barbara J. Schneiderman in Los Angeles. They have three sons: Eric, Andrew, Christopher as well as three grandchildren, Charlotte, Maya, and Kohl.

See also
 List of justices of the Supreme Court of California

References

Videos

External links
 Official Biography from the State of California
 Opinions authored by Ronald M. George. Courtlistener.com.
 Former Justices. California Court of Appeal, Second District.
 Past & Present Justices. California State Courts. Retrieved July 19, 2017.

1940 births
Living people
Princeton University alumni
Stanford Law School alumni
Chief Justices of California
Justices of the Supreme Court of California
Superior court judges in the United States
Judges of the California Courts of Appeal
People from Beverly Hills, California
Lawyers from Los Angeles
California Republicans
20th-century American judges